Manticora (often misspelled Mantichora (Latin term for "manticore") following an unjustified spelling change in 1837) is a well-known genus of tiger beetles that is endemic to Africa. Its members are the largest of the subfamily. All species are darkly colored, nocturnal, and flightless. Males usually have exaggerated mandibles compared to the females, used for clasping during copulation.

Taxonomy
This genus was among the first formally described by a pupil of Carl Linnaeus, Johan Christian Fabricius, in 1781. The name Manticora comes from the ancient Persian for the legendary man-eating manticore. The first species of Manticora described was M. tuberculata, originally described by Charles De Geer in 1778 in the Linnean genus Carabus, to which it is only distantly related as presently defined. When Fabricius established Manticora he designated the species Manticora maxillosa, a junior synonym of M. tuberculata, as the type species.

Subsequently, numerous authors have described a number of additional species, subspecies, and variants, and the exact delimitation of taxa is highly disputed, with experts claiming as few as five species and as many as 13, though it seems the latter number is highly artificial, and not based upon objective criteria or DNA analyses.

Species 
Manticora contains the following species (under the most ambitious scheme; alternative classifications only recognize as few as 5 taxa):

 Manticora congoensis Peringuey, 1888
 Manticora gruti Bouchard, 1892
 Manticora holubi Mareš, 2002
 Manticora imperator Mareš, 1976
 Manticora latipennis Waterhouse, 1837
 Manticora livingstoni Laporte de Castelnau, 1863
 Manticora mygaloides Thomson, 1859
 Manticora scabra Klug, 1849
 Manticora sicheli Thomson, 1859
 Manticora skrabali Mareš, 2000
 Manticora tibialis Boheman, 1848
 Manticora tuberculata Geer, 1778
 Manticora tyrannus Mareš, 2019
 Manticora werneri Mareš, 2000

Manticoras in folklore and popular culture 

In African folklore manticoras are evil creatures, often accused of being responsible for many bad things. According to legend they are doombringers. Some tribes even personify Death as a manticora whose mandibles are an equivalent to the European scythe of death (Mareš, Lapáček, 1980).

In Jules Verne's novel Dick Sand, A Captain at Fifteen, it is a Manticora beetle which helps Cousin Bénédict to escape from imprisonment, when the aforementioned, unguarded in a garden, follows the beetle. Since the beetle escapes from him by flying, it is possible that it is one of Verne's "scholar's jokes" (that is, a joke which only a scientist may recognize; see the entry Jules Verne) (Neff, 1978).

See also
Manticore

References

  (Beetles of Africa)
  (BioLib, Biological Library, a link to a page upon the Manticora genus
 
 Ing Jaroslav Mareš, Vlastimil Lapáček, Nejkrásnější brouci tropů (The most beautiful tropical beetles), Prague, (1980)
 Ondřej Neff, Podivuhodný svět Julese Vernea (The Extraordinary World of Jules Verne), Prague, (1978)

Cicindelidae
Beetles of Africa